Malaysia LED Champions is a part of a Malaysian Government initiative on "Green Economy" toward eco-friendly green products. This Malaysian LED Champions programs consist of 7 major LED lighting manufacturing companies at Malaysia to lead in innovation and production capacity to lead the export drive. These 7 light-emitting diodes (LED) Lighting manufacturing companies are selected by Malaysian Government for this program. They are taken into task to generate and excel on "Green Economy" ambitions by the Malaysian Government. SME Corp as Malaysian Government Agency tasked to conduct various activities and assist on the success of this Malaysia LED Champions Program under Malaysian Economy Plan EPP 10.

7 Major LED Lighting Manufacturer as Malaysia LED Champions 

 AVIALITE
 EXTRA-BUILT
 ECOTECH
 PRIMELUX
 HANS JDQL
 P-PLUS
 LEDVision

ASEAN SME 2015 
All the 7 companies under Malaysia LED Champions under the initiative of SME Corp Malaysia showcase Green Energy products which is LED Lighting for public view. This event was officially launched by Minister of International Trade and Industry of Malaysia, Mustapa Mohamed.

References

Economy and the environment
Light-emitting diode manufacturers
2013 establishments in Malaysia